Nina Landis is an Australian stage and screen actress, who trained in Australia and New York. Her feature film credits include the title role (Rikky) in Rikky and Pete, Komodo, Four of a Kind, Handle with Care, and Blackjack: Sweet Science. Her principal roles on television include  Embassy, Prime Time, The Keepers, One Summer Again, MDA, The Flying Doctors, Prisoner, A Country Practice.  She has performed on the stages of State theatre companies and fringe theatres. Nina Landis also lectures on 'The Art and Nature of Acting', is a voice-over artist, and a documentary photographer.

She studied drama at Flinders University Adelaide in mid/late 1970s.

Filmography 

FILM

TELEVISION

STAGE/THEATRE
 Oedipus The King (1978)
 Oedipus At Colonus (1978)
 Degrees Of Change (1982)
 Too Young For Ghosts (1992)
 No Going Back (1992)

External links
 

Australian film actresses
Australian television actresses
Living people
Flinders University alumni
Year of birth missing (living people)